The Basij (lit. "The Mobilization"), Niru-ye Moghāvemat-e Basij ("Resistance Mobilization Force"), full name Sâzmân-e Basij-e Mostaz'afin ("The Organization for Mobilization of the Oppressed"), is one of the five forces of the Islamic Revolutionary Guard Corps (IRGC). The force is named Basij; an individual member is called basiji in the Persian language. , Gholamreza Soleimani is the commander of the Basij.

A paramilitary volunteer militia established in Iran in 1979 by order of Ayatollah Khomeini, leader of the Iranian Revolution, the organization originally consisted of civilian volunteers who were urged by Khomeini to fight in the Iran–Iraq War. It was an independent organization until 17 February 1981, when it was officially incorporated into the Revolutionary Guards organization structure by the Iranian Parliament in order to end the interservice rivalry between the two, according to Akbar Hashemi Rafsanjani.

Today, the force consists of young Iranians who volunteer, often in exchange for official benefits. Basij serve as an auxiliary force engaged in activities such as internal security, enforcing state control over society, law enforcement auxiliary, providing social services, organizing public religious ceremonies, policing morals, and suppression of dissident gatherings. The force was often present and reacting to the widespread 2009 Iranian election protests and 2017–18 Iranian protests. The Basij are subordinate to and receive their orders from the IRGC and the Supreme Leader of Iran, to whom they are known for their loyalty. They have a local organization in almost every city in Iran.

Basij, being part of the IRGC, is designated as a terrorist organization by the governments of the United States, Bahrain and Saudi Arabia.

Terminology 
Basij is a Persian word which means mobilization, public preparation, nation will, and people determination. Basij  means the unity and preparation of the people to do important works.

History
Supreme Leader Ayatollah Ruhollah Khomeini called for the foundation of a youth militia in November 1979, during the Iranian Revolution. The Basij was established on 30 April 1980. It was open to those above the age of 18 and below the age of 45.

During the Iran–Iraq War hundreds of thousands volunteered for the Basij, including children as young as 12 and unemployed old men, some in their eighties. These volunteers were swept up in Shi'a love of martyrdom and the atmosphere of patriotism of the war mobilization; most often they came from poor, peasant backgrounds. They were encouraged through visits to schools and an intensive media campaign. During the war, the Revolutionary Guard Corps used Basiji members as a pool from which to draw manpower. The Basij may best be known for their employment of human wave attacks which cleared minefields or drew the enemy's fire. It is estimated that tens of thousands were killed through the use of this tactic.

The typical human wave tactic was for Basijis (often very lightly armed and unsupported by artillery or air power) to march forward in straight rows. While casualties were high, the tactic often worked when employed against poorly trained members of the Iraqi regular army.

According to Dilip Hiro, by the spring of 1983 the Basij had trained 2.4 million Iranians in the use of arms and sent 450,000 to the front. In 1985 the IRNA put the number of Basijis at 3 million, quoting from Hojjatoleslam Rahmani. Tehran Bureau estimates the peak number of Basijis at the front at 100,000 by December 1986.

Revival
According to The New York Times, after the spontaneous celebrations following Iran winning a spot in the 1998 FIFA World Cup, and the student protests in July 1999, the Islamic government felt that it had lost control of the streets, and reactivated the Basij. Giving a slightly different timeline, GlobalSecurity.org reports that it was revived around 2005.

The Iranian Government has drawn up a number of different plans to keep the Basij alive. Among these plans is the emphasis on ideas such as Development Basij (Basij-e-Sazandegi). Along with the Iranian riot police and the Ansar-e-Hezbollah, the Basij have been active in suppressing student demonstrations in Iran. The Basij are sometimes differentiated from the Ansar in being more "disciplined" and not beating, or at least not being as quick to beat demonstrators. Other sources describe the Ansar-e-Hezbollah as part of the Basij.

Some believe the change in focus of the Basij from its original mission of fighting to defend Iran in the Iran-Iraq War to its current internal security concerns has led to a loss in its prestige and morale.

2009 election protests
Mir Hussein Moussavi, opposition presidential candidate in 2009, decried violent attacks by the Basij during the 2009 Iranian election protests. There have also been reports of poor performance by Basij after the 2009 election. This was thought to be a reason for the replacement of commander Hossein Taeb and the Basij's formal integration into the Revolutionary Guards ground forces in October 2009. Following the protests, Hojjatoleslam Hossein Taeb, commander of the Basij, stated that eight people were killed and 300 wounded in the violence.

In 2010, a Norwegian student doing research in Iran claims he witnessed gruesome atrocities inside a Basij camp after being abducted by the unit while riding on a bus. According to the account the student gave to Norwegian embassy officials, he witnessed detained political dissidents being 'disemboweled', burned to death, and deliberately crushed by a riot control truck.

During the protests, Supreme Leader Ali Khamenei created the Haydaryan, a new paramilitary force specifically dedicated to preserving his position; several of the founding Haydaryan members came from the Basij.

Syrian Civil War, 2011–present

A Western analyst believed thousands of Iranian paramilitary Basij fighters were stationed in Syria as of December 2013. Syria's geopolitical importance to Iran and its role as one of Iran's crucial allies prompted the involvement of Basij militiamen in the ongoing Syrian Civil War. The Basij militia, similar to Hezbollah fighters, work with the Syrian army against rebel forces. Such involvement poses new foreign policy challenges for a number of countries across the region, particularly Israel and Turkey as Iran's influence becomes more than just ideological and monetary on the ground in the Syrian conflict. The Basij involvement in the Syrian Civil War reflects previous uses of the militia as a proxy force for Iranian foreign policy in an effort to assert Iranian dominance in the region and frightens Salim Idriss, head of the Free Syrian Army.

Organization and membership
Basij form the fifth branch of the Islamic Revolutionary Guard Corps. It is organized into the Imam Hossein Brigades and the Imam Ali Brigades (which deal with security threats). Subgroupings of the Basij include the Primary Pupils Basij [Basij-e Danesh-Amouzi], the Students Basij [Basij-e Daneshjouyi], the University Basij, the Public Service Basij (Basij-e Edarii), and the Tribal Basij. Tehran Bureau also lists a "Basij of the Guilds" (Basij-e Asnaf), and a "Labor Basij" (Basij-e Karegaran). Estimates of the number of Basij vary, with its leadership giving higher figures than outside commentators. Official estimates are as high as 23.8 million. As of 2020 there were 54000 bases around Iran.

Commanders
The Basij is currently commanded by Gholamreza Soleimani, who replaced Gholamhossein Gheybparvar in 2019.

Duties and activities
According to Radio Liberty, by the end of the war, most of the Basijis left the service and were reintegrated back into their lives, often after years of being in the front. By 1988, the number of Basij checkpoints dramatically decreased, but the Basij were still enforcing the hijab, arresting women for violating the dress code, and arresting youths for attending mixed gender parties or being in public with unrelated members of the opposite sex.

Duties vary by province. Basij are deployed against drug traffickers in the eastern border regions and smugglers in Hormuzgan and Bushehr, and on the border with Iraq.

In 1988, college Basiji organizations were established on college campuses to fight "Westoxification" and potential student agitation against the government.

The Ashura Brigades were created in 1993. These Islamic brigades were made up of both Revolutionary Guards and the Basij and by 1998 numbered 17,000.

According to Golkar, the Basij are used to spread the state's ideology, serve as propaganda machine in political campaigns, justify clerical rule, protect politicians, and enforce Islamic morality and rules.  They are part of the Islamic Republic's of Iran's overall avowed plan to have millions of informers.  The Basiji also undermine dissent; for instance, they play a key role in suppressing uprisings and demonstrations.

Benefits and profile of members
Benefits for members of the Basij reportedly include exemption from the 21 months of military service required for Iranian men, reserved spots in universities, and a small stipend. Members of Basij are more likely than non-members to obtain government positions, especially security related positions within government-controlled institutions. While some joined the Basij because of genuine religious convictions, others reportedly join Basij only to take advantage of the benefits of membership and to get admission to university or as a tool to get promotion in government jobs.

Politics
In theory the Basij are banned from involvement in politics by the Iranian constitution, but its leadership is considered active, particularly during and after the 2005 election of President Mahmoud Ahmadinejad. In past elections militia members have voted for both hardliners and reformists. President Ahmadinejad enjoyed significant support from militia members, many of whom have benefited from his policies during his presidency. Supreme Leader Khamenei described Basij as "the greatest hope of the Iranian nation" and "an immaculate tree".

See also 

 Guidance Patrol
 Hezbollah of Iran
 Islamic Revolutionary Guard Corps
 Killing of Neda Agha-Soltan
 List of armed groups in the Syrian Civil War
 Zahra Bani Yaghoub
 Tituskhy (Ukraine)
 Red Guards (China)
 Shabiha (Syria)
 Colectivo  (Venezuela)

Notes

Further reading
 Golkar, Saeid. (2012) Paramilitarization of the Economy: The Case of Iran's Basij Militia, Armed Forces & Society, Vol. 38, No. 4
 Golkar, Saeid. (2015) Captive Society: The Basij Militia and Social Control in Iran. Woodrow Wilson Center Press and Columbia University Press.

External links
 Video Archive of Basij
  – The Basij in the Universities
 
  from Rooz Online
 

Organisations of the Iranian Revolution
Paramilitary organisations based in Iran
Religious paramilitary organizations
Human rights in Iran
Islamic Revolutionary Guard Corps military branches
Pro-government factions of the Syrian civil war
Sex segregation enforcement
1980 establishments in Iran
Militias in Asia
Military youth groups
Military units and formations established in 1980
Organizations designated as terrorist by Bahrain
Organizations designated as terrorist by Saudi Arabia
Organizations designated as terrorist by the United States
Volunteer organizations